ILCE may refer to:

Instituto Latinoamericano de la Comunicación Educativa, the Latin American Institute of Educational Communication in Mexico
Sony ILCE camera, a designation used by Sony since 2013 for mirrorless interchangeable-lens digital system cameras with E-mount
İlçe, a district, a subdivision of a province (il) in Turkey

See also
ILC (disambiguation)
ILCA (disambiguation)